Richard John Eden  (2 July 1922 – 25 September 2021) was a British theoretical physicist who researched quantum field theory, nuclear theory and S-matrix theory in the 1950s and 1960s.

In 1974 he founded the Energy Research Group at the Cavendish Laboratory in Cambridge and from 1982 to 1989 was Professor of Energy Studies there. From 1974, he served on the UK Advisory Committee for Energy Conservation.

He was a founding Fellow of Clare Hall, Cambridge in 1966, and from 1987 to 1999 he was vice president of the college. After retirement he was made an Honorary Fellow.

Career 
Eden was born in London. He received his doctorate in 1951 at Cambridge University under Paul Dirac (The Classical and Quantum Mechanics of Non-holonomic Systems), and received the Smith's Prize in 1949.

In the 1950s, Eden was a leading British exponent of analytic S-matrix studies in elementary particle physics. From 1964 to 1982 he was Reader in Theoretical Physics at the University of Cambridge.

Also in the 1950s, he attended the Institute for Advanced Study in Princeton. This experience led him to develop ideas for a College for Advanced Study in Cambridge. He was subsequently a founding Fellow of Clare Hall, Cambridge in 1966, and from 1987 to 1999 he was vice president of the college.

On the occasion of the 10th anniversary of the founding of Clare Hall, Lord Ashby referred to him as the ‘Father of the Society’. This compliment is reprinted in publications marking the 40th and 50th anniversaries. Eden remained an Honorary Fellow.

In 1972 he took up interdisciplinary energy studies. In 1974 he founded the Energy Research Group at the Cavendish Laboratory. and from 1982 to 1989 was Professor of Energy Studies there. From 1974, he served on the UK Advisory Committee for Energy Conservation.

Malcolm Longair’s Scientific History of the Cavendish Laboratory states ‘there can be no doubt that Eden was ahead of his time in advocating the importance of physics-based interdisciplinary research for the benefit of society.'

Eden was awarded an OBE in 1978, and was a Fellow of the Institute of Physics. In 1970 he received the Maxwell Medal, and in 1989 the Open Award for Distinction in Energy Economics from the British Institute of Energy Economics (BIEE) in London.

His students included Michael Boris Green, John Clayton Taylor, Elliot Leader and Geoffrey C. Fox.

He died in Poole on 25 September 2021, at the age of 99.

Publications 
 
 
 (with Peter Landshoff, David Olive, John Polkinghorne The Analytic S-Matrix, Cambridge University Press, 1966, 2002 
 High Energy Collisions of Elementary Particles, Cambridge University Press, 1967 
 
 
 
 
 
 Energy Conservation in the UK, in: NEDO Report, London, HMSO, 1974
 World Energy Demand, IPC Science and Technology Press, 1978
 (with M.V.Posner, R.Bending, E.Crouch, J.Stanislaw) Energy Economics: Growth, Resources and Policies, Cambridge University Press, 1981 
 (with R. C. Bending, R. K. Cattell) Energy and structural change in the United Kingdom and Western Europe, Annual Review of Energy, Vol. 12, 1987, p. 185–222
 World energy to 2050. Outline scenarios for energy and electricity, Energy Policy, Vol. 21, 1993, p. 231–237
 Clare Hall — The Origins and Development of a College for Advanced Study, Cambridge University Press, 2009

References

External links 
 Clare Hall Cambridge 
 IAS Scholars
 Academic Tree (Physics)

1922 births
2021 deaths
Officers of the Order of the British Empire
Fellows of Clare Hall, Cambridge
Fellows of the Institute of Physics
Scientists from London
Alumni of the University of Cambridge